John McKenna (November 12, 1914 – March 31, 2007) was an American football player, coach, and college athletics administrator.  He served as the head football coach at the Virginia Military Institute (VMI) for 13 seasons, from 1953 until 1965, compiling a record of 62–60–8.  McKenna's teams won four Southern Conference championships and his 62 wins are the most of any coach in VMI Keydets football history.  McKenna died on March 31, 2007, at his home in Decatur, Georgia.

He was inducted into the Virginia Sports Hall of Fame in 2007.

Head coaching record

College

References

External links
 

1914 births
2007 deaths
Georgia Tech Yellow Jackets athletic directors
Loyola Lions football coaches
Villanova Wildcats football coaches
Villanova Wildcats football players
VMI Keydets football coaches
High school football coaches in Pennsylvania
Sportspeople from Lawrence, Massachusetts